Cristina Lyra Fialho (born April 3, 1976, in Rio de Janeiro), known as Cristina Lyra, is a Brazilian sports and newscaster. She is the weather presenter of RedeTV! and also anchors the sports' broadcasts of the same station.

References 

People from Rio de Janeiro (city)
1976 births
Living people
Brazilian television presenters
Brazilian women television presenters